This is a list of British television related events from 1963.

Events

January
7 January – Granada Television first broadcasts World in Action, its influential investigative current affairs series which will run for 35 years.
13 January – The play Madhouse on Castle Street is broadcast in the BBC Sunday-Night Play strand. Little-known young American folk music singer Bob Dylan had originally been cast as the lead but proved unsatisfactory as an actor and the play has been restructured to give him a singing role, he gives one of the earliest public performances of Blowin' in the Wind over the credits.

February
18 February – The Strabane transmitter opens, bringing coverage to the west of Northern Ireland for the first time.

March
23 March – The 8th Eurovision Song Contest is held at the BBC Television Centre in London. Denmark wins the contest with the song Dansevise, performed by Grethe and Jørgen Ingmann.

April
No events.

May
No events.

June
No events.

July
No events.

August
9 August – Ready Steady Go! premieres on ITV.

September
30 September – BBC TV begins using a globe as their symbol. They will continue to use it in varying forms until 2002.

October
No events.

November
22 November – BBC TV interrupts regular programming to report the assassination of John F. Kennedy.
23 November 
William Hartnell stars as the First Doctor in the very first episode of science fiction series Doctor Who. (first of the 4-part serial An Unearthly Child). So many people complain of having missed it, because of the disruption to schedules caused by the assassination of John F. Kennedy, that the following Saturday episode 1 is repeated before the broadcast of episode 2. Doctor Who runs until 1989 with a TV film shown in 1996 and is revived in 2005.
That Was the Week That Was broadcasts a serious Kennedy tribute episode.

December
21 December – First episode of the seven-part serial The Daleks broadcast in the Doctor Who series, introducing the titular aliens (revealed fully in the following week's episode).
28 December – The satirical BBC show That Was the Week That Was (TW3) airs for the last time.

Debuts

BBC Television Service/BBC TV
5 January – The Chem. Lab. Mystery (1963)
18 January – Mr Justice Duncannon (1963)
21 February – Moonstrike (1963)
24 February – The Desperate People (1963)
8 March – The Birth of a Private Man (1963)
31 March – The Sunday Play (1963)
7 April – Jane Eyre (1963)
3 May – The Spread of the Eagle (1963)
18 May – The Stanley Baxter Show (1963–1971)
19 May – Epitaph for a Spy (1963)
3 June – Hornblower (1963)
20 June – Maupassant (1963)
10 July – Taxi! (1963–1964)
13 July – The Dick Emery Show (1963–1981)
16 August – Marriage Lines (1963–1966)
28 August – Citizen 63 (1963)
31 August – Deputy Dawg (1960–1964)
1 September – No Cloak – No Dagger (1963)
3 September – Swallows and Amazons (1963)
22 September – First Night (1963–1964)
30 September – Spotlight South-West (1963–present)
5 October – The Telegoons (1963–1964)
6 October – Dig This Rhubarb (1963–1964)
9 October – Festival (1963–1964)
13 October – Kidnapped (1963)
1 November – Teletale (1963–1964)
23 November – Doctor Who (1963–1989, 1996, 2005–present)
28 November – Bold as Brass (1963–1964)
26 December – Laughter from the Whitehall (1963–1965)
28 December – Meet the Wife (1963–1966)
Unknown – Bleep and Booster (1963–1977)

ITV
3 January – Hancock (1963)
4 January – Badger's Bend (1963–1964)
5 January – 
Dimensions of Fear (1963)
Once Aboard the Lugger (1963)
6 January – Best of Friends (1963)
7 January – World in Action (1963–1998)
27 January – The Twilight Zone (1959–1964; 1985–1989)
2 February – 24-Hour Call (1963)
1 February – The Beverly Hillbillies (1962–1971)
4 February – The Plane Makers (1963–1965)
30 March – 
Jezebel ex UK (1963)
The Human Jungle (1963–1964)
2 April – Crane (1963–1965)
7 April – Space Patrol (1963–1968)
7 May – Sierra Nine (1963)
29 May – The Des O'Connor Show (1963–1973)
31 May – 
Stars and Garters (1963–1966)
The Victorians (1963)
3 June – Love Story (1963–1974)
9 June – Sergeant Cork (1963–1968)
26 July – Bud (1963)
6 August – Smugglers' Cove (1963)
8 August – A Little Big Business (1963–1965)
9 August – Ready Steady Go! (1963–1966)
20 September – Burke's Law (1963–1966)
25 September – Our Man at St. Mark's (1963–1966)
28 September – The Sentimental Agent (1963)
1 October – Five O'Clock Club (1963–1966)
2 October – Espionage (1963–1964)
1 November – Friday Night (1963)
9 November – Emerald Soup (1963)
10 November – That's My Boy (1963)

Continuing television shows

1920s
BBC Wimbledon (1927–1939, 1946–2019, 2021–2024)

1930s
The Boat Race (1938–1939, 1946–2019)
BBC Cricket (1939, 1946–1999, 2020–2024)

1940s
Come Dancing (1949–1998)

1950s
Andy Pandy (1950–1970, 2002–2005)
Watch with Mother (1952–1975) 
Rag, Tag and Bobtail (1953–1965)
The Good Old Days (1953–1983)
Panorama (1953–present)
Picture Book (1955–1965)
Sunday Night at the London Palladium (1955–1967, 1973–1974)
Take Your Pick! (1955–1968, 1992–1998)
Double Your Money (1955–1968)
Dixon of Dock Green (1955–1976)
Crackerjack (1955–1984, 2020–present)
Opportunity Knocks (1956–1978, 1987–1990)
This Week (1956–1978, 1986–1992)
Armchair Theatre (1956–1974)
What the Papers Say (1956–2008)
Grandstand (1958–2007)
Noggin the Nog (1959–1965, 1970, 1979–1982)

1960s
Sykes and A... (1960–1965)
The Flintstones (1960–1966)
Coronation Street (1960–present)
Ghost Squad (1961–1964)
The Avengers (1961–1969)
Points of View (1961–present)
Songs of Praise (1961–present)
Compact (1962–1965)
Steptoe and Son (1962–1965, 1970–1974)
Hugh and I (1962–1967)
The Saint (1962–1969)
Z-Cars (1962–1978)
Animal Magic (1962–1983)

Ending this year
 Zoo Quest (1954–1963)
 That Was The Week That Was (1962–1963)
 The Jetsons (1962–1963, 1985–1987)

Births
 16 January – James May, motoring journalist and television show host
 19 January – Martin Bashir, television journalist
 22 January – Nicola Duffett, actress
 27 January – Mark Moraghan, actor and singer
 10 February – Philip Glenister, actor
 16 March – Jerome Flynn, British actor
 20 March – David Thewlis, English actor
 16 April – Nick Berry, actor and singer
 22 April – Sean Lock comedian and actor (died 2021)
 27 April – Russell T Davies, Welsh-born screenwriter
 11 May – Natasha Richardson, actress (died 2009)
 20 May – Jenny Funnell, radio and television actress
 22 May – David Schneider, actor
 6 June – Jason Isaacs, actor
 2 July – Mark Kermode, British film critic
 3 July – Jo Wheeler, weather forecaster
 31 August – Todd Carty, actor and director
 11 September – Colin Wells, actor
 26 September 
Lysette Anthony, English actress
Jo Caulfield, actress, writer and comedian
 5 October
 Ruth Goodman, social historian and television presenter
 Nick Robinson, broadcast journalist, BBC News political editor
 3 November – Ian Wright, footballer and radio and television presenter
 10 November – Hugh Bonneville, actor
 28 November – Armando Iannucci, Scottish comedian, satirist and producer
 24 December – Caroline Aherne, comic actress/writer (died 2016)
 Unknown – Judy Flynn, actress (Ben and Holly's Little Kingdom)

See also
 1963 in British music
 1963 in British radio
 1963 in the United Kingdom
 List of British films of 1963

References